(Cyclopentadienyl)zirconium trichloride is an organozirconium compound with the formula (CH)ZrCl.  It a moisture-sensitive white solid.  The compound adopts a polymeric structure.  The compound has been well studied spectroscopically.

Synthesis and reactions
It is prepared by chlorination of zirconocene dichloride.  Being polymeric, complex is insoluble in nonpolar solvents. It dissolves in the presence of basic ligands to give adducts.

See also
(Cyclopentadienyl)titanium trichloride, which exists as a monomer.

References

Zirconium(IV) compounds
Chloro complexes
Organozirconium compounds
Cyclopentadienyl complexes
Coordination polymers